

1980

1981

1982

1983

1984

1985

1986

1987

1988

1989

References

External links
 A Brief History of Computing, by Stephen White. The present article is a modified version of his timeline, used with permission.

1980
 01
C01